Alhaiya Bilaval is a Hindustani classical raga. It is the most commonly performed raga of a large group of ragas that are mainly based on a scale more or less identical to the Western major scale. For this reason, that scale itself is known as the Bilaval Thaat. It is often simply referred to as Bilaval, although in the 17th century Alhaiya and Bilaval may have been separate ragas. Alhaiya Bilaval is a raga in which M is the main key.

The Indian National Anthem Jana Gana Mana is sung in the raga Gaud Sarang.  It is believed that the National Anthem of India is sung in raga Alhaiya Bilaval but this is not the case. There is a svara that changes the raga of Jana Gana Mana. In the national anthem, the tivra Madhyam svara is used. Raga Alhaiya Bilaval does not employ the tivra Madhyama svara; raga Alhaiya Bilaval is the raga of all Shuddha Svaras and no other types of svaras. Raga Gaud Sarang has the tivra Madhyama svara.

Character
Thaat: Bilaval

Arohana, Avarohana and Pakad
Arohana: S GR G P ND N S'

Avarohana: S' ND n D P M G MR S

Pakad: G R G P m G m R G P m G m R  S

Vadi and Samavadi
Vadi: dha

Samavadi: ga

Komal Swar: N (Vakra) in Avarohana

Varjit Swar: M in Arohana

Related ragas 
Alhaiya Bilaval is referred to as Bilaval, however, the Wikipedia page refers to Shuddha Bilaval as Bilaval.
Bilaval, Shuddha Bilawal, Devgiri Bilawal, Shukla Bilawal, Kakubh Bilawal

Time
Late Morning, 9 AM to 12 noon

Rasa
Shaant Rasa (peaceful).

References

Literature
Bor, Joep (ed). Rao, Suvarnalata; der Meer, Wim van; Harvey, Jane (co-authors) The Raga Guide: A Survey of 74 Hindustani Ragas. Zenith Media, London: 1999.

External links
 SRA on Samay and Ragas
 SRA on Ragas and Thaats
 Rajan Parrikar on Ragas
 Film Songs in Alhiya Bilawal

Bilb